Scheppau is a river of Lower Saxony, Germany, approximately  long. The Scheppau originates on the slope of the Elm hills and is a left tributary of the Schunter. It flows west and north of Königslutter and joins the Schunter in Glentorf, between Königslutter and Wolfsburg.

See also
List of rivers of Lower Saxony

References

Rivers of Lower Saxony
Rivers of Germany